Hadley's Purchase is a township located in the southernmost portion of Coös County, New Hampshire, United States. As of the 2020 census, the purchase had a population of zero. The purchase lies entirely within the White Mountain National Forest.

In New Hampshire, locations, grants, townships (which are different from towns), and purchases are unincorporated portions of a county which are not part of any town and have limited self-government (if any, as many are uninhabited).

History 

Geography 
The highest summit in Hadley's Purchase is  Mount Crawford, in the center of the purchase.

Demographics 

As of the 2010 census, there were no people living in the township.

References

Townships in Coös County, New Hampshire
Berlin, New Hampshire micropolitan area
Townships in New Hampshire